Buga Township or Buga Hui Ethnic Township is a rural ethnic township in Zhaoyang District of Zhaotong, Yunnan, China. It borders Shouwang Township and Zhongshui Township of Weining County in the east, Taoyuan Township of Ludian County in the southwest, and Yongfeng Town in the northwest.

Administrative division
The township is divided into 5 villages: 
 Buga Village
 Baishi Village
 Xinjie Village
 Hualuping Village
 Yingshui Village

Geography
The township has three reservoirs: Baoshanxu Reservoir, Sujiaba Reservoir and Shishuijing Reservoir.

Di River flows through the township.

Climate

Economy
The economy is supported primarily by farming, ranching, and mineral resources.

Education

There are 9 primary schools in the township.

Religion
The locals believe in Islam and the township has 32 mosques.

References

Divisions of Zhaoyang District
Ethnic townships of the People's Republic of China